The Women's high jump event  at the 2004 IAAF World Indoor Championships was held on March 6–7.

Medalists

Results

Qualification
Qualification: Qualification Performance 1.96 (Q) or at least 8 best performers advanced to the final.

Final

References
Results

High
High jump at the World Athletics Indoor Championships
2004 in women's athletics